Arabella Chapman (1859–1927) was an African-American woman who is best remembered for being the first student to graduate from upstate New York's Albany School for Educating People of Color, later known as Albany High School.

Biography
She was born free in Jersey City, New Jersey. By 1870, her family had migrated to Albany, New York, where Chapman would be raised in that city's thriving African-American community. She first attended Wilberforce School, before going on to Albany Free Academy (now Albany High School). In 1877, she became the first African American to graduate from the Free Academy, and by 1880, she was teaching music. Her marriage to Clarence Miller led Chapman to leave Albany, traveling with Miller to North Adams, Massachusetts, where he would be employed as a waiter and she would raise their children.

Chapman created two photographic albums in the 1870s and 1880s. These albums survive in the collection of the University of Michigan's William L. Clements Library. They are rare items that document Chapman's personal and political vision. The photographic portraits included those of notable figures such as Abraham Lincoln, Frederick Douglass, and John Brown. Most striking are the portraits of Chapman herself, along with her family and friends. Through Chapman's careful curatorship, the albums convey a sense of how African Americans constructed their social and cultural worlds in the post-Civil War era.

Chapman's photo albums were exhibited in the 2013–14 exhibition, Proclaiming Emancipation, at the University of Michigan as examples of how the memory of the Civil War, Emancipation, and citizenship was constructed by ordinary people.

Arabella Chapman's photo albums have been curated as part of an on-line exhibit, The Arabella Chapman Project at arabellachapman.com.

References

External links
 Arabella Chapman's photo albums at the University of Michigan's William L. Clements Library
 The Arabella Chapman Project at arabellachapman.com

African-American historians
Historians from New York (state)
American women historians
African-American women writers
1859 births
1927 deaths
Writers from Albany, New York
19th-century American photographers
Academics from New Jersey
19th-century American women
20th-century African-American people
20th-century African-American women